= Japanese Journal of Clinical Oncology =

- Discipline: Oncology
- Language: English
- Edited by: Tadao Kakizoe

Publication details
- History: 1971-present
- Publisher: Oxford University Press
- Frequency: Monthly
- Impact factor: 1.905 (2016)

Standard abbreviations
- ISO 4: Jpn. J. Clin. Oncol.

Indexing
- CODEN: JJCOAC
- ISSN: 0368-2811 (print); 1465-3621 (web)

Links
- Journal homepage; Online access; Online archive

The Japanese Journal of Clinical Oncology is a monthly peer-reviewed medical journal covering clinical oncology. It was established in 1971 and is published by Oxford University Press. The editor-in-chief is Tadao Kakizoe. According to the Journal Citation Reports, the journal has a 2016 impact factor of 1.905.
